Anx (short for "anxiety") is a studio album by American hip hop duo Dark Time Sunshine. It was released by Fake Four Inc. on July 24, 2012. It features guest appearances from the likes of P.O.S, Aesop Rock, and Busdriver. Music videos were created for "Never Cry Wolf", "Valiant", and "Take My Hand".

Critical reception
Charles Mudede of The Stranger gave the album a favorable review, calling it "a masterpiece". Andrew Matson of The Seattle Times said: "Highlights are 'Prairie Dog Day' and 'Cultclass,' which sound like a sunset and a rainbow of oil on concrete, respectively." Impose included the album on the "Best Music of July 2012" list.

In 2015, City Pages placed "Overlordian" at number 3 on the "P.O.S's 10 Best Deep Cuts" list.

Track listing

References

External links
 
 

2012 albums
Hip hop albums by American artists
Fake Four Inc. albums